Events in the year 1796 in Norway.

Incumbents
Monarch: Christian VII

Events
14 April - Hans Nielsen Hauge received his "spiritual baptism" in a field near his farm at Rolvsøy.

Arts and literature
 Det Dramatiske Selskab in Arendal is founded.
 Gamlebyen Church was built.

Births
19 March - Christopher Andreas Holmboe, philologist (d.1882)
14 April - Frederik Due, politician (d.1873)
10 October - Thomas Konow, naval officer and politician (d.1881)

Deaths

See also